Mad Bastards is a 2011 Australian drama film written and directed by Brendan Fletcher. Set in the Kimberley region of Western Australia, the film uses mainly local Aboriginal people in the cast, and draws on their stories for the plotline. It is Fletcher's debut film and it premiered at the 2011 Sundance Film Festival.

Plot
Years ago, TJ abandoned his wife and son, and as time passes his conscience tells him it is time to face up to his responsibilities as a father. TJ is an Aboriginal man living in Western Australia and has a weakness for alcohol and a habit of getting into fights. TJ's son Bullet is nearly as troubled as he is - at the age of 13, he has already been arrested for arson, and instead of serving a sentence in a juvenile detention home, he is released to the custody of Elders. Bullet is not eager to reacquaint himself with TJ, but both realise they need to settle their scores with one another, and Bullet's grandfather Texas steps in to help.

Cast
 Dean Daley-Jones as TJ
 Lucas Yeeda as Bullet
 Karla Hart as TJ's sister
 Alex Lloyd as Musician
 Douglas Macale as Uncle Black
 Patrick McCoy-Geary as Bullet's mate
 Kelton Pell as Mad Dog
 Alan Pigram as Musician
 Ngaire Pigram as Nella
 Stephen Pigram as Musician
 Greg Tait as Texas
 John Watson as Bush Camp Elder

Production 
Director and scriptwriter Brendan Fletcher, usually based in Sydney, wrote the film in collaboration with the lead actors, who were local Indigenous people, and John Watson, an elder of the Jarlmadangah people. 
The storyline was developed from the true stories of local Indigenous people of the Kimberley region in Western Australia, where the film was shot.

Greg Tait, a Gidja man was a reformed young offender who became a policeman, was given a leading role.

The film was co-produced by musician brothers Alan Pigram and Stephen Pigram, who also provided an original score and performed in the film, along with David Jowsey and Fletcher. Ngaire Pigram, Stephen's daughter, played the female lead role.

Reception
Mad Bastards received positive reviews from critics and audiences, earning an approval rating of 88% on Rotten Tomatoes.
Michelle Orange of SBS gave the film three stars out of five. She observed that the "over-reliance on score sets up an avoidant rhythm that begins to feel like a lack of narrative confidence." However she also points out that "Fletcher’s atmospheric approach is not without moments of emotional power, and the raw, unyielding landscapes of Northwestern Australia are framed to resonant effect."

Awards and nominations

References

External links
 

2011 films
2011 drama films
2011 directorial debut films
Australian drama films
2010s English-language films
Films about Aboriginal Australians